Drouot may refer to:

 Antoine Drouot (1774–1847), French general
 Jean-Claude Drouot (born 1938), Belgian actor
 Hôtel Drouot, Paris auction house
 Richelieu – Drouot (Paris Métro), metro station
 Drouot, an inner-city (cité ouvrière) in Mulhouse, Haut-Rhin, France